James Hannay may refer to:
 James Hannay (writer) (1827–1873), Scottish novelist, journalist and diplomat
 James Hannay (minister) (c. 1595–1661), Scottish clergyman
 James Ballantyne Hannay(1855–1931), Scottish chemist
 George A. Birmingham, pen name of James Owen Hannay (1865–1950), Irish clergyman and novelist